Abdou Ibrahim Youssef (born 27 December 1981) is a Qatari middle-distance runner. He competed in the men's 800 metres at the 2000 Summer Olympics.

References

1981 births
Living people
Athletes (track and field) at the 2000 Summer Olympics
Qatari male middle-distance runners
Olympic athletes of Qatar
Place of birth missing (living people)
Athletes (track and field) at the 1998 Asian Games
Asian Games competitors for Qatar